Złotniki Kujawskie  is a village in Inowrocław County, Kuyavian-Pomeranian Voivodeship, in north-central Poland. It is the seat of the gmina (administrative district) called Gmina Złotniki Kujawskie.

The village has a population of 2,400.

References

Villages in Inowrocław County
Poznań Voivodeship (1921–1939)
Pomeranian Voivodeship (1919–1939)